The Church of Jesus Christ of Latter-day Saints in El Salvador refers to the Church of Jesus Christ of Latter-day Saints (LDS Church) and its members in El Salvador. On March 2, 1951, the first 12 converts in El Salvador were baptized. As of December 31, 2021, there were 129,194 members in 158 congregations in El Salvador. In 2019, El Salvador had the second most LDS Church members per capita in North America, behind the United States.

History

Church membership grew from the initial converts, and was up to 15,000 by the mid 1980s before growing to 38,000 and further doubling by 2000.

Missions

Temples
The San Salvador El Salvador Temple was announced on November 7, 2007 by President Henry B. Eyring. The ground was broken for the temple in September 2008, with the temple being dedicated on August 21, 2011.

See also

Religion in El Salvador

References

External links
LDS Newsroom - El Salvador
 

 
Christianity in El Salvador